James Aloysius Byrne (June 22, 1906 – August 27, 1980) was an American politician who served as a Democratic member of the U.S. House of Representatives for Pennsylvania's 3rd congressional district from 1953 to 1973.

Jim Byrne was born in Philadelphia, Pennsylvania to Katherine (née Foody) and James P. Byrne, all four of his grandparents were Irish immigrants.  He attended St. Joseph's College in Philadelphia.  He was engaged in business as a mortician from 1937 to 1950.  He was the county registrar for the Bureau of Vital Statistics, 1934–1939.  He served as chief deputy United States Marshal 1940–1943, and as United States marshal for eastern district of Pennsylvania from 1943 to 1945.  He was the senior disbursing officer of the Pennsylvania State Treasury from 1945 to 1950.  He was a delegate to the Democratic National Convention in 1936.  He was a member of the Pennsylvania State House of Representatives in 1951 and 1952.  He was elected in 1953 as a Democrat to the 83rd and to the nine succeeding Congresses.  He was an unsuccessful candidate for renomination in 1972. Byrne and fellow congressman Bill Green III were put together by redistricting.  Green won the primary.

He died on September 3, 1980 and was interred at Holy Sepulchre Cemetery in Cheltenham Township, Pennsylvania.

The James A. Byrne Courthouse in Philadelphia is named in his honor and the grand oak tree in the central courtyard at the University of Pennsylvania was renamed "Byrne's Oak".

References

1906 births
1980 deaths
American people of Irish descent
Politicians from Philadelphia
Saint Joseph's University alumni
United States Marshals
American funeral directors
Democratic Party members of the United States House of Representatives from Pennsylvania
20th-century American politicians